Korsar may refer to:

 Luch Korsar, Russian unmanned aerial vehicle designed by OKB Luch
 RK-3 Corsar, Ukrainian antitank missile designed by DerzhKKB Luch